The FIS Alpine World Ski Championships 2011 were the 41st FIS Alpine World Ski Championships, held 7–20 February in Germany at Garmisch-Partenkirchen, Bavaria.

These were the second alpine world championships in Garmisch-Partenkirchen, which previously hosted in 1978.  It also hosted the first Olympic alpine skiing competition, a combined event at the 1936 Winter Olympics.

The FIS awarded the championships on 25 May 2006, in Vilamoura, Portugal.  The runner-up was Schladming, Austria, which hosted the next championships in 2013. Prior to landing the 2011 event in 2006, Garmisch-Partenkirchen had unsuccessfully bid to host the world championships five times in the previous two decades.

Most of the competitions took place on the Kandahar slopes of Garmisch Classic, one of the two skiing areas of Garmisch-Partenkirchen. The slalom course was at Gudiberg, adjacent to the Große Olympiaschanze, the ski jumping hill. Unseasonal spring-like conditions prevailed during the two weeks of competition.

Course information

Medal winners

Men's events

Women's events

Team event

Medal table

Participating nations
525 athletes from 69  countries will compete. Haiti will make its debut.

See also
 2011 IPC Alpine Skiing World Championships

References

External links

 GaP 2011.com  – official site
 FIS-Ski.com – AWSC 2011 – calendar & results

 
2011
International sports competitions hosted by Germany
2011 in alpine skiing
2011 in German sport
Alpine skiing competitions in Germany
2010s in Bavaria
Sport in Garmisch-Partenkirchen
February 2011 sports events in Germany